Ludham - Potter Heigham Marshes is a  biological Site of Special Scientific Interest north-east of Norwich in Norfolk. Part of the site is a Nature Conservation Review site, Grade I, and a National Nature Reserve. It is part of the Broadland Ramsar site and Special Protection Area, and The Broads Special Area of Conservation.

This is described by Natural England as "both a nationally important wetland site and one of the richest areas of traditionally managed grazing marsh and dykes now remaining in Broadland". The principal conservation lies in the aquatic flora and fauna of the dykes, especially the dragonflies.

Public footpaths cross the site.

References

Sites of Special Scientific Interest in Norfolk
National nature reserves in England
Nature Conservation Review sites
Ramsar sites in England
Special Protection Areas in England
Special Areas of Conservation in England
Ludham